The Medora River is a  tributary of the Montreal River on the Keweenaw Peninsula of Michigan in the United States. It forms the outlet of Lake Medora.

See also
List of rivers of Michigan

References

Michigan  Streamflow Data from the USGS

Rivers of Michigan
Tributaries of Lake Superior